The Compact Oxford English Dictionary may refer to either of two books published by Oxford University Press:
 The Compact Editions of the Oxford English Dictionary, which contain the full text of the Oxford English Dictionary photographically reduced to fit in one or two volumes instead of up to 20 volumes for the conventional editions. 
 The Compact Oxford English Dictionary of Current English, a single-volume general-purpose dictionary.